Vezvar (also Romanized as Vezvār) is a village in Tuskacheshmeh Rural District, in the Central District of Galugah County, Mazandaran Province, Iran. At the 2006 census, its population was 331, in 104 families.

References 

Populated places in Galugah County